KS Heko Czermno is a Polish football club based in Czermno, Poland.

Heko was founded in 1998 and after a meteoric rise up the league pyramid twice it fell into financial difficulties twice and finally folded in 2011.

It reached the second division in 2005 after having started at the very bottom of the pyramid upon its foundation. However that proved to be a big financial burden and the club withdrew after the season after narrowly missing out on promotion in the promotion play-offs to Stal Stalowa Wola. After starting once again from the bottom of the pyramid in 2006 the club reached the fifth division in 2008. By the 2009–2010 season the club had financial problems once more and despite good results withdrew mid-way. The club started at the bottom of the pyramid once more in 2010 and completed the season but the club folded in 2011.

See also 

 Football in Poland
 List of football teams

External links
 Official website
 90minut.pl profile

Association football clubs established in 1998
1998 establishments in Poland
Association football clubs disestablished in 2011
2011 disestablishments in Poland
Końskie County
Football clubs in Świętokrzyskie Voivodeship